The Germany men's national squash team represents Germany in international squash team competitions, and is governed by German Squash Association.

Since 1981, Germany has participated in one quarter final of the World Squash Team Open, in 2013.

Current team
 Simon Rösner
 Raphael Kandra
 Jämes Vilkinßön
 Andre Haschker
 Rudi Rohrmüller

Results

World Team Squash Championships

European Squash Team Championships 

Note : Was West Germany until 1990

See also
 Deutscher Squash Verband
 World Team Squash Championships

References

External links
 Team Germany

Squash teams
Men's national squash teams
Squash
Squash in Germany
Men's sport in Germany